Sir Broderick Chinnery, 1st Baronet (13 February 1742 – May 1808), was an Irish politician and baronet.

He was the fourth son of Reverend George Chinnery and his wife Eleanor Whitfield, daughter of William Whitfield. Chinnery was barrister and became High Sheriff of County Cork in 1786. He sat as Member of Parliament for Castlemartyr from 1783 to 1790. Subsequently he represented Bandonbridge in the Irish House of Commons until the Act of Union in 1801 and thereafter Bandon in the Parliament of the United Kingdom until 1806. On 29 August 1799, Chinnery was created a Baronet, of Flintfield, in the County of Cork.

In February 1768, he married firstly his second cousin Margaret Chinnery, daughter of Nicholas Chinnery. They had three daughters and three sons. Margaret died in 1783, and Chinnery married secondly Alice Ball, fourth daughter of Robert Ball on 2 July 1789. He had two sons and two daughters by his second wife. Chinnery was succeeded in the baronetcy by Broderick, his eldest and only surviving son of his first marriage.

References

1742 births
1808 deaths
Baronets in the Baronetage of Ireland
Irish MPs 1783–1790
Irish MPs 1790–1797
Irish MPs 1798–1800
Members of the Parliament of Ireland (pre-1801) for County Cork constituencies
High Sheriffs of County Cork
Members of the Parliament of the United Kingdom for County Cork constituencies (1801–1922)
UK MPs 1801–1802
UK MPs 1802–1806